In the Eastern Orthodox Church the term "Venerable" is commonly used as the English-language translation for the title that is given to monastic saints (Greek: Hosios, Church Slavonic: Prepodobny).

Serbian
Venerable Avakum (Deacon Avakum) - 
Venerable Anastasia of Serbia (Ana Nemanjić) - 
Venerable Angelina of Serbia (Angelina Branković) -  and 
Venerable Visarion Saraj - 
Venerable Gavrilo of Lesnovo - 
Venerable Grigorije of Gornjak - 
Venerable David (Dmitar Nemanjić) - 
Venerable Jelena of Dečani (Ana-Neda) - 
Venerable Jelisaveta (Princess Jelena Štiljanović) - 
Venerable Jefrosinija (Jevgenija) (Princess Milica of Serbia) - 
Venerable Jeftimije of Dečani - 
Venerable Joachim of Osogovo - 
Venerable Joanikije II - 
Venerable Joasaph, Serbian Meteorite - 
Venerable Nestor of Dečani - 
Venerable Nicodemus of Tismana (Nikodim Grčić) - 
Venerable Prohor Pčinjski - 
Venerable Rafailo of Banat - 
Venerable Simeon the Monk (Stefan Nemanjić) - 
Venerable Sinaites: Romylos of Vidin, Roman, Nestor, Martirije, Sisoje, Zosim of Tuman and  Jov - 
Venerable Stephen of Piperi -  
Venerable Teoktist (Stefan Dragutin) -

See also

List of saints
List of blesseds
List of Servants of God
Venerable

References

Serbian list by title

External links
Patron Saints Index

Ven
Lists of Eastern Orthodox Christians